libdca (formerly libdts) is a free library for decoding DTS Coherent Acoustics streams. It is released under the terms of the GNU General Public License, and is developed by Gildas Bazin of the VideoLAN team. The library is based on the DTS Coherent Acoustics standard (ETSI 102 114 v1.2.1).

The library is used in VLC media player and is able to decode DTS audio tracks from DVDs. It can also decode DTS files (.dts) directly, as well as DTS-WAV files (.wav). libdca is able to decode DTS-ES streams as well, however can only decode the standard 6 channels as the additional "Extended Surround" extensions (for Matrix and 6.1 Discrete) require ES Extensions to the codec.

libdca comes packaged with a small proof of concept decoder dcadec (formerly dtsdec). This program is able to decode DTS audio streams into stereo WAV or into a single multichannel WAV, as well as being able to be played back through the sound card.

The development for libdca is mostly frozen by 2007 (version 0.0.5). The 2018 update (version 0.0.6) only includes changes to the build system. An unrelated program and library from 2016, also known as dcadec, provides some extra functions including support for the ES and HD extensions, the 96/24 format, and Master Audio streams. It has since displaced libdca in providing DCA/DTS support as an integral part of ffmpeg.

See also

 Digital Theater System
 VLC media player

References

External links
 libdca Project Homepage
 ESTI Publications Download Area - Search for "DTS Coherent Acoustics" for the ETSI standard publication

C (programming language) libraries
Free computer libraries
Audio libraries